Coryne muscoides is a species of athecate hydroid belonging to the family Corynidae. It is a species of the north-eastern Atlantic Ocean and the Mediterranean Sea. This is a many-branched rose-coloured hydroid, up to 15 cm tall with distinctive ringed stems and branches. Each branch ends with a cluster of knobbed tentacles. It can be found in deep rock pools and attached to large seaweeds.

References
Coryne muscoides at World Register of Marine Species

Corynidae
Animals described in 1761
Taxa named by Carl Linnaeus